In enzymology, a 2,5-diaminovalerate transaminase is an enzyme that catalyzes the chemical reaction

2,5-diaminopentanoate + 2-oxoglutarate  5-amino-2-oxopentanoate + L-glutamate

Thus, the two substrates of this enzyme are 2,5-diaminopentanoate and 2-oxoglutarate, whereas its two products are 5-amino-2-oxopentanoate and L-glutamate.

It employs one cofactor, pyridoxal phosphate.

Nomenclature 

This enzyme belongs to the family of transferases, specifically the transaminases, which transfer nitrogenous groups.  The systematic name of this enzyme class is 2,5-diaminopentanoate:2-oxoglutarate aminotransferase. Other names in common use include diamino-acid transaminase, and diamino acid aminotransferase.

References 

 

EC 2.6.1
Pyridoxal phosphate enzymes
Enzymes of unknown structure